Liangping South railway station is a railway station in Liangping District, Chongqing, China. It is an intermediate stop on the Chongqing–Wanzhou intercity railway. It opened with the line on 28 November 2016.

In March 2021, the service level was reduced from 35 to 23 trains per day. However, from October 2021, the number of daily services was increased from 23 to 30.

See also
Liangping railway station

References 

Railway stations in Chongqing
Railway stations in China opened in 2016